Carrick is a townland in County Westmeath, Ireland. The name Carrick also applies to 33 other townlands in Ireland.

Carrick is one of 10 townlands of the civil parish of Lackan in the barony of Corkaree in the Province of Leinster. The neighbouring townlands are: 
Grange to the north, Lackan to the east, Leny to the south and Ballinalack and Cullenhugh to the west.

In the 1911 census of Ireland there were 3 houses and 18 inhabitants in the townland.

References

External links
Carrick at the IreAtlas Townland Data Base
Carrick at Townlands.ie
 Carrick at Logainm.ie

Townlands of County Westmeath